Changing Woman may refer to:

 Asdzą́ą́ Nádleehé, a Navajo creator deity
 Changing Woman (album), an album by Buffy Sainte-Marie